Jajantaram Mamantaram is a 2003 Indian fantasy action comedy film directed by Soumitra Ranade and produced by Arunima Roy. The film is based on Jonathan Swift's 1726 novel Gulliver's Travels. It is the film through which Jaaved Jaffrey came to be known in the Bollywood industry.

Cast
 Javed Jaffrey as Aditya Pandit
 Gulshan Grover as Chattan Singh
 Manav Kaul as Jeran
 Joy Fernandes as Jhamunda
 Nishith Dadhich  as Bantul
 Dilip Joglekar as Bhoopati
 Kavita Murkar as chotu`s mother
 Dipannita Sharma as Jalpari
 Madhura Velankar as Rajkumari Amolhi

Plot
Aditya is carried to a magical island where he helps the tiny locals defeat the giant Jhamunda.

Soundtrack 
Soundtrack was composed by Three Brothers and Violin.
Mil gaye yaro ab hum - Udit narayan
Gumsum Gumsum – Nihay, Madhumitha, Tanmay
Rambam - Usha Uthup
Chaal hain - Gulshan Grover

References

External links

2003 films
2003 action comedy films
2000s Hindi-language films
Indian action comedy films
Indian children's comedy films
Indian fantasy comedy films
Films based on Gulliver's Travels
Films shot in Maharashtra
2003 comedy films
2000s children's comedy films
2000s fantasy comedy films